Wing Commander Samuel Gyabaah was a Ghanaian soldier and politician. He was a member of the then Supreme Military Council (SMC) and the Minister for the Upper Region (now divided into the Upper East and Upper West regions) from 1978 until 4 June 1979 when the Armed Forces Revolutionary Council (AFRC) took over power in a coup d'état. Following the overthrow of the SMC, he was appointed Chief of Air Staff by the AFRC on 6 June 1979. He held this appointment until July 1979 when he was replaced by Captain F. W. K. Klutse.

See also
 Supreme Military Council (Ghana)
 Chief of Air Staff (Ghana)

References

Ghanaian military personnel
Chiefs of Air Staff (Ghana)
Ghana Air Force personnel
Ghanaian politicians